Pack is a former municipality in the district of Voitsberg in the Austrian state of Styria. Since the 2015 Styria municipal structural reform, it is part of the municipality Hirschegg-Pack.

Geography
Pack lies west of Graz near Pack Pass on the border between Styria and Carinthia.

References

Cities and towns in Voitsberg District